"Badlaa" is the tenth episode of the eighth season of the American science fiction television series The X-Files. The episode was written by John Shiban and directed by Tony Wharmby. "Badlaa" is a "Monster-of-the-Week" story, unconnected to the series' wider mythology. The episode received a Nielsen rating of 7.3 and was viewed by 11.8 million viewers. Overall, the episode received mostly negative reviews from critics.

The series centers on FBI special agents Dana Scully (Gillian Anderson) and her new partner John Doggett (Robert Patrick)—following the alien abduction of her former partner, Fox Mulder (David Duchovny)—who work on cases linked to the paranormal, called X-Files. When a mystic smuggles himself out of India, Scully and Doggett give chase as his murderous spree starts terrorising two families in suburban Washington, D.C. But Scully soon comes upon a crisis of faith when she realises how dissimilar her techniques are from those of Mulder, even as she tries to be the believer.

"Badlaa" was inspired by stories of Indian fakirs as well as the idea of someone asking for money actually being "a bad guy." Gurdeep Roy, a noted stuntman better known as Deep Roy, was chosen to play the part of the antagonistic beggar. The episode's title means "vengeance" or "revenge" in Hindi.

Plot
At the Sahar International Airport in Mumbai, India, an obese American businessman dismissively makes his way past a paraplegic beggar missing his legs from the knee down. While using the airport's toilet, the businessman is pulled out of the stall violently by the beggar he passed earlier. Later, the businessman checks into a Washington, D.C., hotel and sits down on his bed. Soon, blood streams out of his bodily orifices.

Dana Scully (Gillian Anderson) arrives late to the crime scene and John Doggett (Robert Patrick) tells her that the man's blood all drained abruptly in the hotel. A child's bloody print is found, but Scully doesn't believe that a child did this. Meanwhile, the beggar, somehow disguised as an ordinary-looking white man, applies for a janitorial job at a Cheverly, Maryland, elementary school. In the morgue, Scully describes the massive stomach damage done to the body which leads Doggett to the idea of drugs being forcibly cut out of him. However, the man showed no sign of drugs in the blood tests and Scully tells Doggett that his time of death was 24 to 36 hours prior, long before he left India. Due to a discrepancy in weight, she begins to believe that there was a passenger in the corpse.

Quinton, a student at the elementary school in Cheverly, calls his father up to his room after he sees the legless beggar man at night. His father tells him that he imagined it. The father goes back downstairs, but then screams. Quinton rushes down and finds his dad dead, his eyes dripping blood. Doggett and Scully investigate this latest death after the police tell them about the strange man the boy saw. While discussing the lack of any damage to the body except the broken blood vessels in the eyes, Scully comes to the conclusion that the man is still inside the latest victim. She rushes to the morgue and finds the boy's father with a distended belly. She cuts into him and then sees a hand emerge from the scalpel incision. After being knocked over, she follows a bloody trail to a storage closet, but finds no one inside. Having turned invisible to Scully, the beggar watches her.

At the school, the principal tells the janitor that she was very worried when he did not show up that morning. Trevor, a bully who had previously tormented Quinton, sees flickers of the beggar through his janitor's guise. Trevor later goes to Quinton's home to apologize and express sympathy over Quinton's father's death. He also tells Quinton who he thinks killed his father.

Scully and Doggett consult Chuck Burks, an old friend of Fox Mulder's, who tells them about the fakir, ascetic masters who kind themselves to torture in order to attain enlightenment. He also tells the agents that Siddhi mystics could do the things Scully described; the mystics have powers of the mind and can alter people's perceptions of reality and their secret practices are passed on from father to son. When Doggett remains skeptical of both Chuck's insights and the Siddhi, Chuck remarks to Scully that he isn't surprised because "it's hard to believe in something you can't understand." Struggling to see the case as Mulder might, Scully consults with Chuck again and the two discuss how that if a Siddhi mystic were to use their powers for murder would violate the very foundation of their lives and endanger their souls. Scully then shares a theory that revenge might drive a Siddhi to act in such a way and that one such Siddhi is seeking retribution against persons who worked for an American chemical plant in Vishi, outside of Mumbai, that inadvertently released a gas cloud that killed 118 people. One victim was the 11-year-old son of a holy man of the beggar caste.

After hearing a strange squeaking sound--which are the wheels of the unseen fakir's dolly--he runs home, brushing past his mother in the foyer. Trevor's mother follows him outside to find him face-down in their pool. She dives in to get him, but his form turns into the beggar. At the scene of the crime, the real Trevor returns home and tells Scully that the "little man" followed him and killed his mother. Acting on Trevor's tip about the janitor, Doggett and the police arrest him. After Scully calls Chuck Burks, he turns up with his video camera hoping to capture footage of a fakir. To Doggett's bewilderment, the video camera shows no one sitting in the chair the janitor appears to be seated in and Doggett and Chuck realize they do not, in fact, have a suspect in custody. Doggett calls Scully, who has gone to Trevor's house to speak with him only to find that Trevor is not at home and snuck out past his father.

Quinton and Trevor hunt the fakir at school where the principal and her assistant call Scully to make her aware they've seen the janitor back at work. The fakir turns the hunt around and begin stalking the boys, eventually taking Trevor's form just as Scully arrives. Scully hesitantly fires at the boy, wounding the fakir who reverts back to his true form. Following the shooting, Scully weeps as she realizes she was "just not capable of" viewing this particular case without prejudice, without judgment, or with having an open mind as Mulder would have done.

Two weeks later at the Sahar International Airport, the fakir, unharmed, watches another American businessman with a large frame pass by.

Production

The title of "Badlaa"—which was written by John Shiban and inspired by stories of Indian fakirs—means "to retort" or "to revenge" in Urdu. Shiban was also inspired when he wondered: "What if someone who came up to me and asked me for money was actually a bad guy?" Shiban later noted that his early drafts of the episode featured the antagonist "with no legs who can actually shrink himself and climb inside your ear". Carter vetoed the idea and suggested that it be revised. Shiban later said that "... one thing about this episode that I'm sort of proud is that people often have told me that it is the most disgusting thought that they ever had, that this little man would actually enter your body and travel around inside you."

The scenes featuring the Indian airport were filmed at a cruise line terminal in Long Beach, California. Ilt Jones, the location manager for the series, felt that the "dated feel" of the terminal added to the scene. He noted, "if you look at newsreel footage of India, they always have old English cars from the sixties, the cruise line terminal in Long Beach was perfect."

Casting director Rick Millikan was tasked with finding a suitable actor to play the part of the beggar. Millikan's only instructions were to look for "a small all-Indian man with no legs." Eventually, Gurdeep Roy, better known as Deep Roy was chosen to play the part. Deep Roy was a noted stunt man who had notably played Droopy McCool of the Max Rebo Band in Return of the Jedi. Deep Roy, however, is not an amputee and so a cart with a false bottom was created. Anytime there was a scene where the beggar had to move, blue screen technology was used to add the background in during post-production. The cart featured a distinct "squeak" that Paul Rabwin described as "creepy". He noted, "There was a squeak that had to let us know that it was him. It had to scare us [...] Finally we came up with what we thought was just the right squeak and John [Shiban] said 'Okay, that's the one.'"

Producer Paul Rabwin was displeased with the episode, noting, "'Badlaa' was the one episode I did not like the most [...] I think if I had done it different, I would have had John Shiban change the method of transportation. I don't think it ever worked on any level for me. It was just weird and creepy, but I think the whole idea was distasteful to me." He later bluntly concluded that "it's the only episode that I kind of wish we hadn't done."

Reception
"Badlaa" first aired on Fox on 21 January 2001. The episode earned a Nielsen household rating of 7.3, meaning that it was seen by 7.3% of the nation's estimated households. The episode was viewed by 7.46 million households and 11.8 million viewers. The episode ranked as the 50th most-watched episode for the week ending January 21. The episode subsequently debuted in the United Kingdom on the BBC Two on May 12, 2002. Fox promoted the episode with the tagline "Imagine a man who can squeeze into a shoebox... a suitcase... or a victim."

Critical reception to the episode was mostly negative. Television Without Pity writer Jessica Morgan rated the episode a "C" and criticized the episode's plot holes, such as how the beggar appears back in India after being shot by Scully. Robert Shearman and Lars Pearson, in their book Wanting to Believe: A Critical Guide to The X-Files, Millennium & The Lone Gunmen, rated the episode two stars out of five. The two noted that the episode was "best" when "it's at its most tasteless", citing the beggar "crawling up the bottom of an obese man" as "pretty tasteless". Shearman and Pearson, however, noted that it suffered from the fact that "it doesn't have the courage of its convictions".

Emily VanDerWerff of The A.V. Club awarded the episode a "C+", calling it "a messy episode". She argued that it is an example of "magnificently bad television". This in turn, makes it somewhat entertaining; VanDerWerff argued that she would "rather watch this episode several times than I would some of those season seven outings where everybody seemed like they would rather be just about anywhere else." However, she did compliment the episode's gross-out scares, noting that the beginning was "a pretty great cold open". Tom Kessenich, in his book Examinations, was extremely critical of the episode. Referring to it as the series' "nadir", he ridiculed the plot and sarcastically labeled the main villain "Butt Munch". Paula Vitaris from Cinefantastique gave the episode a negative review and awarded it one star out of four. Vitaris, sardonically referring to the episode as "The X(enophobic)-Files", noted that while "the butt-crawler is new, the plot is pure "X-Files generic Monster-of-the-Week." Matt Hurwitz and Chris Knowles noted in their book The Complete X-Files that the episode soon became known as the "'Butt Genie' episode" among fans.

Despite the negativity, several reviews wrote positively of the episode's antagonistic beggar. Both TV Guide and UGO Networks listed him amongst the greatest monster-of-the-week characters in The X-Files. The UGO review, in particular, noted that the character was "One of the series' more blatant allegories [...], as a legless Indian Mystic [...] literally climbs into his victims to travel where he will. [...] Scully and Doggett investigate the bloody goings-on [...] and a gut-wrenching climax, though not entirely successful, still opens up some thorny issues over how we view weakness, deformity, race, and 'otherness.'

Notes

Footnotes

Bibliography

External links 

2001 American television episodes
Television episodes set in India
Television episodes set in Maryland
Mumbai in fiction
Television episodes about revenge
The X-Files (season 8) episodes